Péter Pokorni (born 21 November 1989 in Paks) is a Hungarian football player who plays for Paksi SE.

External links
 

1989 births
Living people
People from Szekszárd
Hungarian footballers
Association football goalkeepers
Paksi FC players
MTK Budapest FC players
Szolnoki MÁV FC footballers
Nemzeti Bajnokság I players
Sportspeople from Tolna County